Duncan Eagles (born 1985) is an English jazz saxophonist, composer and teacher. He performs in venues in Britain and at festivals around the world, in his own groups, such as Partikel, and as a sideman, having performed with Zara McFarlane, Shabaka Hutchings, Gary Husband, Melt Yourself Down, Mark Mondesir, Jason Rebello, Ola Onabule and Janek Gwizdala.

Early life and education 
Eagles was born in Sutton, South London. He graduated from Trinity Laban Conservatoire of Music and Dance in 2007 with a Bachelor of Music degree in jazz.

Career 
He was described as "fast becoming one of the most exciting players emerging on the UK jazz scene" by Jazzwise. With Partikel he has released four albums and they were described as “one of the most exciting trios in improvised music” (Jazz Podium). Their album String Theory included a string quartet. The Guardian reviewed the album:

"Saxophonist Duncan Eagles has sought a fresh challenge, in balancing Partikel’s familiar free-jazzy energy with a compositional coherence that draws the textures of the string players and the trio into striking and often unexpectedly seductive accords." It was listed in The Daily Telegraph's best albums of 2015.

According to the BBC Music Magazine, "Eagles's tone on his various horns achieves an impressive blend of colours and dynamics. His compositions and arrangements, embracing sinuous, sinewy elegance, spiky funk and languid ballads, repay close attention."

He also teaches saxophone, is a tutor at 'The Dordogne International Jazz Summer School' in France and previously at The Hideaway jazz club.

Discography 

 Road Ahead (2013), Mark Perry and Duncan Eagles Quintet, FIRECD65
 Citizen (2019), Duncan Eagles, Ropeadope RAD-443

With Partikel (Duncan Eagles, Max Luthert, Eric Ford)

 Partikel (2010) CD 5060183700314
 Cohesion (2012), Whirlwind Recordings WR4618
 String Theory (2015) Whirlwind Recordings WR4671 (with Matthew Sharp, Carmen Flores, Benet McLean, David Le Page)
 Counteraction (2017) Whirlwind Recordings WR4699 (with Matthew Sharp, SiSi Lu, Anna Cooper, Ant Law, Benet McLean)
 Anniversary Song (2022) Berthold Records BR 321099

With Million Square (Max Luthert and Duncan Eagles)

 Between Suns (2018)
 Seeps a Light (2020)
 Spirit Bloom (2020)

With Jazz Proof (Duncan Eagles, Dan Redding, George Bone, Max Luthert, Louie Palmer)

 Dinner With Dave (2010)
 Jazz Proof (2011)  CD Barcode: 5055400846661

Other albums

 Uptown Blues (2011), Ramon Goose, Blues Boulevard 250300
 Sutures and Stitches (2013), Ollie Howell featuring Duncan Eagles, Mark Perry, Matt Robinson, Max Luthert
 Live at the 606 (2013) Benet McLean Band, 33Jazz Records.
 Orbital (2014), Max Luthert, Whirlwind Recordings WR4659
 The Bopped and the Bopless (2016), Benet McLean Band, 33Xtreme Records.
 Self-Identity (2017), Ollie Howell, Ropeadope
 Ask, Seek, Knock (2017) Samuel Eagles' Spirit featuring Duncan Eagles, Sam Leak, Ralph Wyld, Max Luthert, Dave Hamblett, 	Whirlwind Recordings WR 4709
 Two Late (2018), Tim Staffell, Strike Back Records – SBR220CD
 Khoalesce (2018), Caroline Scott, CSCD001

References

External links 
 
 Million Square
 Partikel

1985 births
Living people
British male jazz musicians
British male saxophonists
Alumni of Trinity College of Music
People from Sutton, London